La Cornue is a French oven and cooking range manufacturer, founded in 1908 by Albert Dupuy, a Parisian herbalist and perfumer. The company currently produces three types of ovens: Château, CornuFé, and CornuChef.

History
Dupuy founded La Cornue in order to create ovens that used a new type of natural gas being used in Paris. By taking advantage of the circulation of hot air within the oven, he was able to create a much more effective oven than the others at the time. This first oven was called Rôtisseuse-Pâtissiere La Cornue (La Cornue Roast and Pastry cook).

In the 1950s, Albert Dupuy was succeeded by André Dupuy and the company was modernised. The 5 Etoiles (5 Star) range was also introduced at this time. The company was further modernised following the takeover of Xavier Dupuy in 1985, despite remaining a small business of around 60 staff.

In 2015 Middleby Corporation acquired Aga Rangemaster Group which included La Cornue.

References

External links
Official website

Cooking appliance brands
Manufacturing companies of France
French brands